Greer is an unincorporated community and coal town in Monongalia County, West Virginia, United States.

References 

Unincorporated communities in West Virginia
Unincorporated communities in Monongalia County, West Virginia
Coal towns in West Virginia